USS Thomas G. Kelley (DDG-140) is a planned  guided missile destroyer of the United States Navy, the 90th overall for the class. She will be named for Thomas G. Kelley, a former United States Navy captain and recipient of the Medal of Honor as a lieutenant commander during the Vietnam War. She was officially named by Secretary of the Navy Carlos Del Toro at the Surface Navy Association's annual symposium on 11 January 2023.

References

 

Arleigh Burke-class destroyers
Proposed ships of the United States Navy